Rebutia canigueralii is a species of cactus in the genus Rebutia, native to Bolivia. It has gained the Royal Horticultural Society's Award of Garden Merit.

References

canigueralii
Endemic flora of Bolivia
Plants described in 1964